Saint-Maur–Créteil is a railway station in the commune of Saint-Maur-des-Fossés, Val-de-Marne. It is served by RER A and in the future, Paris Metro Line 15 in 2025.

History
Saint-Maur–Créteil opened in its current form as an RER station on 14 December 1969 as part of the initial segment of the RER network with trains to Nation in central Paris and Boissy-Saint-Léger.

Service

Train 
Saint-Maur–Créteil is on the A2 branch of the RER A with eastbound trains to Boissy-Saint-Léger and westbound trains to Saint-Germain-en-Laye. During peak times, there are up to twelve trains per hour (every five minutes). At off-peak times trains arrive every ten minutes and every fifteen minutes early mornings and late nights.

Bus connections
The station is served by several buses:

References

Réseau Express Régional stations
Railway stations in France opened in 1859
Railway stations in Val-de-Marne